Monika Germann (born April 23, 1954) is a former Swiss cross-country skier who competed in the early 1980s. She finished sixth in the 4 × 5 km relay at the 1984 Winter Olympics in Sarajevo.

Cross-country skiing results

Olympic Games

External links
Women's 4 x 5 km cross-country relay Olympic results: 1976-2002 

Cross-country skiers at the 1984 Winter Olympics
Living people
Swiss female cross-country skiers
1954 births
20th-century Swiss women